Lou Guinares (born 18 March 1990) is a New Zealand male weightlifter, competing in the 56 kg category and representing New Zealand at international competitions.

Major competitions

References

1990 births
Living people
New Zealand male weightlifters
Weightlifters at the 2010 Commonwealth Games
Commonwealth Games competitors for New Zealand
Place of birth missing (living people)
Weightlifters at the 2014 Commonwealth Games
21st-century New Zealand people